Henry Edmund Bothfeld (March 4, 1859 – May 4, 1953) was an American businessman, and politician who  served as the mayor of Newton, Massachusetts and as a member of the Massachusetts House of Representatives.

Early life
Bothfeld was born to Herman F. and Julia (Ferguson) Bothfeld in New York, New York on March 4, 1859.

Family life
Bothfeld married Haldee Soule in Newton, Massachusetts on June 18, 1885, they had four children Theodore, Haldee, Helen and Henry Soule.

Public service

Newton, Massachusetts city government
Bothfeld was active in the civic affairs of the city of Newton, Massachusetts, serving on the School Committee, Common Council, as a member of and the President of the Board of Aldermen. In 1895, he served as the mayor of Newton.

Massachusetts House of Representatives
From 1910 to 1915  Bothfeld served as a member of the Massachusetts House of Representatives from the Fourth  Middlesex District.

See also
 1915 Massachusetts legislature

References

 
 

Republican Party members of the Massachusetts House of Representatives
Mayors of Newton, Massachusetts
Massachusetts city council members
1859 births
1953 deaths